Thomas Charles Pannell, Baron Pannell, PC (10 September 1902 – 23 March 1980) was a British Labour Party politician.

He entered local politics in the outer London suburbs: he was a member of Walthamstow Borough Council from 1929 to 1936 and of Erith Borough Council from 1938 to 1955, and served as Mayor of Erith in 1945–46. He also sat on Kent County Council, where he was deputy leader of the Labour group from 1946 to 1949.

He was elected Member of Parliament for Leeds West at a 1949 by-election, and served until his retirement at the February 1974 general election.

Pannell served as Minister of Public Building and Works in the first Wilson government, 1964–66. He once served as a pairing whip for future Conservative leader Margaret Thatcher and was among the first to tip her as a future Prime Minister.

On 21 June 1974 he was created a life peer, taking the title Baron Pannell, of the City of Leeds.

References

External links 
 
 Parliamentary Archives, Papers of Thomas Charles Pannell MP, 1902-1980

|-

1902 births
1980 deaths
Amalgamated Engineering Union-sponsored MPs
Labour Party (UK) MPs for English constituencies
Labour Party (UK) life peers
Mayors of places in Greater London
Members of the Privy Council of the United Kingdom
Ministers in the Wilson governments, 1964–1970
UK MPs 1945–1950
UK MPs 1950–1951
UK MPs 1951–1955
UK MPs 1955–1959
UK MPs 1959–1964
UK MPs 1964–1966
UK MPs 1966–1970
UK MPs 1970–1974
UK MPs who were granted peerages
Life peers created by Elizabeth II